Emily Taft Douglas (April 10, 1899 – January 28, 1994) was a Democratic Party politician from the U.S. state of Illinois. She served as a U.S. Representative at-large from 1945 until 1947 and was married to U.S. Senator Paul Douglas from 1931 until his death in 1976. She was the first female Democrat elected to Congress from Illinois, and her election made Illinois one of the first two states (the other being California) to have been represented by female House members from both parties.

She was the daughter of sculptor Lorado Taft and a distant relative of U.S. President William Howard Taft.

Life and career 
Born Emily Taft in Chicago, Illinois to sculptor Lorado Taft and his wife Ada Bartlett Taft, Emily Taft graduated from the University of Chicago Laboratory School and then the University of Chicago with honors in French. She joined the Democratic Party because of her support for Woodrow Wilson's push for the League of Nations. After graduating from the University of Chicago she studied at the American Academy of Dramatic Art. She was a working actress for two years before going to work for the League of Women Voters in 1924. She married University of Chicago economics professor Paul Douglas in 1931, who she had met through League of Women Voters functions.

While vacationing in Italy in 1935, the Douglases witnessed the aftermath of Mussolini's invasion of Ethiopia. The experience convinced them that the forces of fascism represented a grave threat to the United States. Both Douglases became involved in Illinois state and local politics in the years leading up to World War II. After the outbreak of the war, Paul Douglas enlisted in the Marine Corps in 1942. Emily Taft Douglas ran for the Illinois at-large congressional seat in 1944, defeating Republican incumbent Stephen A. Day. Day was a member of the isolationist wing of the Republican Party. Douglas ran on a platform advocating the formation of an international alliance of countries.

In addition to working for the formation of the United Nations, Douglas also sought to ban the building or use of nuclear weapons.

Douglas lost her bid for re-election to the United States House of Representatives in 1946. She was appointed US Representative to the United Nations Educational, Scientific and Cultural Organization in 1950. In later life Douglas was active in various Unitarian organizations. In 1986, she moved from Washington to Briarcliff Manor, New York, where she lived until her death. On January 28, 1994, Douglas died at a nursing home in nearby White Plains, New York.

Douglas authored several books, including Appleseed Farm (1948), Remember the ladies; The story of great women who helped shape America (1966), and Margaret Sanger; Pioneer of the Future (1969).

See also
 Women in the United States House of Representatives

References

External links 
 

1899 births
1994 deaths
Taft family
Female members of the United States House of Representatives
Politicians from Chicago
Spouses of Illinois politicians
University of Chicago alumni
Writers from Chicago
Women in Illinois politics
American Unitarians
American Unitarian Universalists
Democratic Party members of the United States House of Representatives from Illinois
University of Chicago Laboratory Schools alumni
20th-century American politicians
20th-century American women politicians
People from Briarcliff Manor, New York
20th-century American writers
20th-century American women writers